Barsaive Campaign Set is a supplement published by FASA in 1993 for the fantasy role-playing game Earthdawn.

Publication
Barsaive Campaign Set, the first major supplement for Earthdawn, was designed by Christopher Kubasik, with contributions from Rob Cruz, Tom Dowd, Sam Lewis, Mike Mulvihill, Diane Piron-Gelman and Louis Prosperi.

Contents
This supplement details the fictional land of Barsaive. It comes as a boxed set that contains 
 an Explorer's Guide
 a Gamemaster's Book
 a poster map
 cardstock sheets containing 36 new monster and treasure cards
 a cardboard sextant

Content about the land of Barsaive includes geography; its people, societies and social norms; laws; secret societies; notable personalities; and politics.

Reception
In the May 1994 edition of Dragon (Issue #205), Rick Swan admitted that he hadn't been enamored of Earthdawn when he first reviewed it three issues previously, calling it "a warmed-over version of the AD&D game." But Swan found that the Barsaive supplement successfully moved "the Earthdawn game away from light fantasy and toward [a] sophisticated setting-based approach." Swan concluded, "With the Runequest game on the ropes, the Earthdawn game may be poised to take its place, especially if [FASA] continues with supplements as strong as this."

In the May 1994 edition of Pyramid (Issue #7), Scott Haring gave the game a thumbs up, saying, "This is an excellent game supplement, reasonably priced. For people who play Earthdawn more than once a year or so, it's an absolute must-have. For everybody else, it's just a must-have."

Reviews
White Wolf #47 (Sept., 1994)
Valkyrie #1 (Sept., 1994)
Backstab #5
Rollespilsmagasinet Fønix (Danish) (Issue 2 - May/June 1994)

References

Earthdawn supplements
Role-playing game supplements introduced in 1993